Halsbury's Laws of Canada is a comprehensive national encyclopedia of Canadian law, published by LexisNexis Canada, which includes federal, provincial and territorial coverage. It is the only Canadian legal encyclopedia covering all fourteen Canadian jurisdictions. Following an alphabetized title scheme, it covers 119 discrete legal subjects. Individual titles range from 50 to 1,000 pages.

Written by leading practitioners, jurists and academics, Halsbury’s Laws of Canada is an authoritative exposition of Canadian statutes, regulations and case law. It provides definitive information about black-letter law, without opinion or commentary, and without archival cases or outdated statutory references (except where necessary). Statutory material and case law are drawn together within a narrative text to provide a clear exposition of the current law of Canada.

Halsbury’s Laws of Canada is written in a clear and accessible style, suitable for users ranging from first-year law students to experienced counsel. Each subject title is, as far as possible at the time of publication, a complete statement of Canadian law on that topic as of the currency date specified at the beginning of the title.

The commentary is set out in numbered paragraphs (e.g. “HCR-x” for Criminal Offences and Defences), summarizing the applicable statutes and leading cases from every Canadian jurisdiction. Each numbered paragraph is followed by extensive footnotes. The footnotes provide full citations (and pinpoint references, where appropriate) to the authorities summarized in the commentary. They also contain any qualifications, exceptions, ancillary matters, and helpful comments on areas of uncertainty.

Each Halsbury’s Laws of Canada title is updated annually by way of a cumulative supplement, and thoroughly revised and reissued every four years. The main work and the supplements are available both in print and online.

History
Halsbury’s Laws of Canada was first published in 2006. It is the Canadian equivalent of Halsbury’s Laws of England, which began publishing in 1907.

Editions
The First Edition was completed in 2012. It originally consisted of 76 print volumes. Halsbury’s Laws of Canada currently comprises 72 print volumes and 119 discrete titles.

Features
Halsbury’s Laws of Canada contains helpful cross-references to numbered paragraphs, both within each title and between titles. Each title contains a variety of useful appendices, from glossaries consolidating key statutory definitions to indexes and selected secondary sources. Each title also contains comprehensive tables of cases, statutes and statutory instruments, as well as general, detailed and sectional tables of contents, an ambit section, a statement of currency, a list of related titles and references and abbreviations.

A Companion Guide and Consolidated Index, published separately, combines all information from individual title indexes in the main work, making it possible to locate where a particular subject is discussed without knowing within which title it falls, and to find every reference to that subject within the main work.

Authorship
Halsbury’s Laws of Canada provides authoritative expert commentary by many of Canada's leading legal subject matter experts. They include Master Linda S. Abrams, Peter A. Downard, Professor Bruce Feldthusen, the Hon. Stephen E. Firestone, the Hon. Stephen Goudge, Alan D. Gold, the Hon. Roger T. Hughes, Ian Hull, the Rt. Hon. David Johnston, Professor Bruce MacDougall, the Hon. Graeme Mew, Ruth Sullivan, Lorne Waldman and Professor Janet Walker.

Titles
The Halsbury’s Laws of Canada collection currently includes the following titles:

Aboriginal (2020 Reissue)
Access to Information and Privacy (2020 Reissue)
Administrative Law (2022 Reissue)
Agriculture (2022 Reissue)
Alternative Dispute Resolution (2022 Reissue)
Athletics (2021 Reissue)
Aviation and Space (2021 Reissue)
Banking and Finance (2020 Reissue)
Bankruptcy and Insolvency (2021 Reissue)
Business Corporations (2022 Reissue)
Cemeteries and Interment (2022 Reissue)
Charities, Associations and Not-For-Profit Organizations (2022 Reissue)
Civil Procedure (2021 Reissue)
Commercial Law I: Agency (2020 Reissue)/Auctions (2020 Reissue)/Bailment (2020 Reissue)/Betting, Gaming and Lotteries (2020 Reissue)
Commercial Law II: Bills of Exchange (2020 Reissue)/Consumer Protection (2020 Reissue)/Sale of Goods (2020 Reissue)
Communications (2019 Reissue)
Compensation and Rights of Crime Victims (2019 Reissue)
Competition and Foreign Investment (2019 Reissue)
Condominiums (2019 Reissue)
Conflict of Laws (2020 Reissue)
Constitutional Law – Charter of Rights (2019 Reissue)
Constitutional Law – Division of Powers (2019 Reissue)
Construction (2021 Reissue)
Contracts (2021 Reissue)
Controlled Drugs and Cannabis (2021 Reissue)
Copyright (2019 Reissue)
Criminal Offences and Defences (2020 Reissue)
Criminal Procedure (2020 Reissue)
Crown (2021 Reissue)
Customs and Excise (2021 Reissue)
Damages (2021 Reissue)
Debtor and Creditor (2022 Reissue)
Defamation (2018 Reissue)
Discrimination and Human Rights (2022 Reissue)
Education (2022 Reissue)
Elections (2022 Reissue)
Employment (2019 Reissue)
Environment (2022 Reissue)
Equitable Remedies (2020 Reissue)
Estoppel (2020 Reissue)
Evidence (2022 Reissue)
Expropriation (2019 Reissue)
Extradition and Mutual Legal Assistance (2019 Reissue)
Family (2022 Reissue)
Firearms, Weapons and Explosives (2022 Reissue)
Fires (2022 Reissue)
Food (2022 Reissue)
Forestry (first published 2019)
Gifts (2022 Reissue)
Guarantee and Indemnity (2022 Reissue)
Holidays (2021 Reissue)
Hospitality (2021 Reissue)
Hunting and Fishing (2021 Reissue)
Immigration and Citizenship (2019 Reissue)
Income Tax (Corporate) (2019 Reissue)
Income Tax (General) (2021 Reissue)
Income Tax (International) (2019 Reissue)
Infants and Children (2022 Reissue)
Inquests, Coroners and Medical Examiners (2021 Reissue)
Insurance (2019 Reissue)
Interim Preservation of Property Rights (2021 Reissue)
Judges and Courts (2022 Reissue)
Labour (2020 Reissue)
Landlord and Tenant (2021 Reissue)
Legal Profession (2021 Reissue)
Legislation (2021 Reissue)
Legislatures (2019 Reissue)
Limitation of Actions (2021 Reissue)
Liquor Control (2021 Reissue)
Maritime Law (2020 Reissue)
Media and Postal Communications (2021 Reissue)
Medicine and Health (2021 Reissue)
Mental Health (2019 Reissue)
Military (2019 Reissue)
Mines and Minerals (2019 Reissue)
Misrepresentation and Fraud (2019 Reissue)
Missing Persons and Absentees (2019 Reissue)
Mortgages (2019 Reissue)
Motor Vehicles (2019 Reissue)
Municipal (2020 Reissue)
Occupations and Trades (2019 Reissue)
Oil and Gas (2021 Reissue)
Partnerships (2021 Reissue)
Patents, Trade Secrets and Industrial Designs (2020 Reissue)
Penitentiaries, Jails and Prisoners (2022 Reissue)
Pensions (2019 Reissue)
Personal Property and Secured Transactions (2021 Reissue)
Planning and Zoning (2021 Reissue)
Police, Security and Emergencies (2022 Reissue)
Public Health (2019 Reissue)
Public Inquiries (first published 2019)
Public International Law (2019 Reissue)
Public Utilities (2022 Reissue)
Real Property (2021 Reissue)
Receivers and Other Court Officers (2021 Reissue)
Religious Institutions (2022 Reissue)
Restitution (2021 Reissue)
Roads, Highways and Bridges (2022 Reissue)
Securities (2022 Reissue)
Social Assistance (2019 Reissue)
Taxation (General) (2020 Reissue)
Taxation (Goods and Services) (2020 Reissue)
Technology and Internet (2020 Reissue)
Torts (2020 Reissue)
Trademarks, Passing Off and Unfair Competition (2020 Reissue)
Transportation (Carriage of Goods) (2020 Reissue)
Transportation (Railways) (2020 Reissue)
Trusts (2020 Reissue)
Vital Statistics (2019 Reissue)
Weights and Measures (first published 2019)
Wildlife, Livestock and Pets (2019 Reissue)
Wills and Estates (2020 Reissue)
Workplace Health and Safety (2019 Reissue)
Youth Justice (2019 Reissue)

Related publications
Halsbury’s Laws of Canada has counterparts in several common law jurisdictions, including Australia, England, Hong Kong, India, Malaysia, New Zealand and Singapore.

Editors in chief
David Keeshan: 2006 – 2011
Jay Brecher: 2011 – 2016
Shirley Margolis: 2016 – present

References

Law books
Law of Canada
Halsbury's Laws
Encyclopedias of law